J. J. Williams may refer to:

John J. Williams (soldier) (1843–1865), last soldier killed in Civil War
James J. Williams (1853–1926), English-born photographer in Kingdom of Hawaii
John James Williams (poet) (1869–1954), Welsh poet, pen name J.J. Williams
John J. Williams (politician) (1904–1988), American Republican senator from Delaware
J. J. Williams Jr. (1905–1968), American legislator from Virginia 
J. J. Williams (rugby union) (1948–2020), Welsh rugby union winger
JJ Williams (soccer) (born 1998), American soccer forward